One of the Boys is an American sitcom television series that aired on NBC from January 23 to April 24, 1982. It starred Mickey Rooney, Dana Carvey, Nathan Lane, and Scatman Crothers. TV Guide ranked it number 24 on its TV Guide's 50 Worst Shows of All Time list in 2002.

Plot
Oliver Nugent (Mickey Rooney) was a spry senior citizen, who, along with his friend, Bernard Solomon (Scatman Crothers) leave their nursing home, and move in with his college-aged grandson, Adam Shields (Dana Carvey), who is attending Sheffield College in New Jersey, and his roommate, Jonathan Burns (Nathan Lane).  Also involved is Adam's girlfriend, Jane (Meg Ryan) and their landlady, Mrs. Green (Francine Beers), who is more than entranced with Oliver.

Cast
Mickey Rooney as Oliver Nugent
Dana Carvey as Adam Shields
Nathan Lane as Jonathan Burns
Scatman Crothers as Bernard Solomon
Francine Beers as Mrs. Green

Recurring
Meg Ryan as Jane

Episodes

External links
 

1982 American television series debuts
1982 American television series endings
1980s American sitcoms
1980s American college television series
English-language television shows
NBC original programming
Television series by Sony Pictures Television
Television shows set in New Jersey